Antenore Belletti (born May 5, 1905, at Mantua – died 1985, Rodano) was an Italian craftsman and the father of Stelio Belletti.

Career
Antenore Belletti was employed as foreman before and during the Second World War at the Società Italiana Ernesto Breda, after which he went on to work for Piero Magni Aviazione, where he specialized in manufacturing fuselages for military and commercial mid-weight aircraft. 

He began working for himself in 1945, opening a small workshop in the Ortica district of Milan, where he mainly repaired American aircraft fuselages as well as built new ones for Milanese companies. He collaborated on projects with companies such as Caproni, Fratelli Nardi and Aviamilano. 

Belletti worked independently in his workshop with the help of his son Stelio Belletti. 

At the beginning of the 60s, Belletti moved his workshop into a larger space in Rodano, a town in the province of Milan and, thanks to a loan granted to him by Artigiancassa, invested in the purchase of a TIG welder, a welding technique still relatively unused in Italy in those years. The purchase of this equipment allowed him to specialize in TIG welding. 

Thanks to the rapprochement of technicians Giuseppe Pattoni and Lino Tonti in the early 60s, Belletti began some fruitful collaborations with motorcycle companies. In the motorcycle industry, Antenore Belletti primarily worked for brands such as Paton, Linto, Guazzoni, Puch Frigerio and Honda, building frames for Grand Prix motorcycles. 

In the mid-70s, Belletti Sr. gradually began to pass his business onto his son Stelio, who, after founding the brand Stelbel in 1973, began to concentrate his efforts on constructing racing bicycle frames.

1905 births
1985 deaths
Businesspeople from Mantua
Italian cycle designers